John Dunn (16 February 1866, Kingston upon Hull – 18 December 1940, Harrogate) was the most prominent English violinist at the turn of the 20th century and composer. He was considered especially successful in interpreting works by Niccolò Paganini.

Life 
His first public performance happened when he was only 9. Soon he went to the Leipzig Conservatory. Studied with Henry Schradieck. After completing the course and returning to Britain he performed as soloist at Covent Garden (in 1882), The Proms, Crystal Palace, Glasgow Choral Union concerts, Royal Amateur Orchestral Society, bur also in Berlin and Leipzig.

In approximately 1900 he took a concert tour in America, during which he used an exotic 'Russian' pseudonym Ivan Donoiewski. In 1902 he made the first performance of Pyotr Ilyich Tchaikovsky's Violin Concerto in England.

His compositions include a Violin Concerto, a Sonatina for piano and minor pieces, among others a Soliloquy and a Berceuse. He also wrote a number of cadences to Ludwig van Beethoven's Violin Concerto.

The 1843 'John Dunn' violin by Giuseppe Rocca is named after him.

Compositions 
Book
 John Dunn. Violin Playing. 3rd ed.: 1915 (1st ed. 1898; 4th ed. 1923)
Musical compositions
 Petite valse de concert, Op. 4, for violin and piano (©1924)
 Fairy Oraces, Op. 5, for violin and piano (©1924)
 Caprice Chinois, Op. 6, for violin and piano (©1924)
Arrangements of works by other composers
 Caprice No.9 by Niccolò Paganini, for violin and piano (©1924)
 Nocturne by Pyotr Ilyich Tchaikovsky, in F major, for violin and piano (©1924)

Sources

References

External links 
 John Dunn playing Niccolò Paganini's Caprice No.13

1866 births
1940 deaths
English violinists
English composers
People from Kingston upon Hull